Zeta Gruis, Latinised from ζ Gruis, is a solitary star in the southern constellation of Grus. It is visible to the naked eye as a faint, orange-hued star with an apparent visual magnitude of 4.12. Based upon an annual parallax shift of 24.5 mas as seen from the Earth, the system is located about 133 light-years from the Sun.

Having exhausted the supply of hydrogen at its core, the star has expanded and cooled; at present it has 10 times the girth of the Sun.

References

K-type giants
Grus (constellation)
Gruis, Zeta
Durchmusterung objects
217364
113638
8747